is a Japanese football player. He plays for Avispa Fukuoka.

Career
Shun Nakamura joined J2 League club Thespakusatsu Gunma in 2016. After one season, he stayed in the J2 League and joined Montedio Yamagata where he played 147 games over 4 seasons for the club. After a brief spell at J1 League club Shonan Bellmare in 2021, in July of the same year it was announced Nakamura would be joining Avispa Fukuoka.

Club statistics
.

References

External links
Profile at Avispa Fukuoka

1994 births
Living people
Komazawa University alumni
Association football people from Chiba Prefecture
Japanese footballers
J2 League players
Thespakusatsu Gunma players
Montedio Yamagata players
Shonan Bellmare players
Avispa Fukuoka players
Association football midfielders